Beauharnois is a provincial electoral district in the Montérégie region of Quebec, Canada that elects members to the National Assembly of Quebec. The district notably include the city of Salaberry-de-Valleyfield.

It was created in 2001 from parts of Beauharnois-Huntingdon, Châteauguay and Salaberry-Soulanges.

In the change from the 2001 to the 2011 electoral map, its territory was unchanged.

An earlier version of the Beauharnois electoral district had been created for the 1867 election (and an electoral district of that name existed earlier in the Legislative Assembly of the Province of Canada and the Legislative Assembly of Lower Canada).  Its last election was in 1985.  It disappeared in the 1989 election and its successor electoral district was Beauharnois-Huntingdon.

Members of the Legislative Assembly / National Assembly

Election results

 
 
   
 

 

   
 
  
 
 
 

* Result compared to Action démocratique

|-
 
|Liberal
|Louis-Charles Roy
|align="right"|8,811
|align="right"|33.64
|align="right"|

}
|Independent
|Christian Grenon
|align="right"|467
|align="right"|1.78
|align="right"|
|}

|-
 
|Liberal
|Jean-Guy Hudon
|align="right"|7,679
|align="right"|24.32
|align="right"|
|-

|}

|-
 
|Liberal
|Mario Faubert
|align="right"|13,265
|align="right"|42.77
|align="right"|

|-

|}

References

External links
Information
 Elections Quebec

Election results
 Election results (National Assembly)

Maps
 2011 map (PDF)
 2001 map (Flash)
2001–2011 changes (Flash)
1992–2001 changes (Flash)
 Electoral map of Montérégie region
 Quebec electoral map, 2011

Quebec provincial electoral districts
Salaberry-de-Valleyfield